Beaver Island is one of the Beaver Island group of Falkland Islands.

History and population
Beaver Island was named after the whaling vessel "Beaver" which was recorded as being the first whaling ship to double Cape Horn.

Beaver Settlement lies on the island, with an airstrip nearby. It is owned by Sally and Jerome Poncet.

Wildlife
Wildlife on the island includes gentoo penguins, South American gray foxes (introduced, not to be confused with the Falkland Islands wolf), peregrine falcons, crested and striated caracaras, guanacos, fur seals, and many seabirds. Beds of kelp can be found offshore.

The Beaver Island Group has been identified by BirdLife International as an Important Bird Area.  At least 40 species have been recorded, with 34 known to breed there.  Species for which the group is an important breeding site include Falkland steamer ducks (245 pairs), gentoo penguins (2850 pairs), Magellanic penguins (2000 pairs), and southern giant petrels (300 pairs).

References
 Stonehouse, B (ed.) Encyclopedia of Antarctica and the Southern Oceans (2002)

External links
Beaver Island

Islands of the Falkland Islands
Important Bird Areas of the Falkland Islands
Seabird colonies
Penguin colonies